Walter Ruben may refer to:

 J. Walter Ruben (1899–1942), American screenwriter, film director and producer
 Walter Ruben (Indologist) (1899–1982), German Indologist